Andreas Eschbach (born 15 September 1959, in Ulm) is a German writer, primarily of science fiction. His stories that are not clearly in the SF genre usually feature elements of the fantastic.

Biography 

Eschbach studied aerospace engineering at the University of Stuttgart and later worked as a software engineer. He has been writing since he was 12 years old. His first professional publication was the short story Dolls, published in 1991 in German computing magazine C't. His first novel was published in 1995. Nine of his novels have won the Kurd-Laßwitz-Preis, one of the most prestigious awards in the German SF scene. Four of his novels have won the Deutscher Science Fiction Preis.

His novels have also been translated into a number of languages, including English, French, Italian, Russian, Serbian, Polish, Turkish, Japanese and Portuguese.

In 2002, his novel Jesus Video was adapted for German television. In 2003, his novel Eine Billion Dollar was adapted for German radio. His only novels translated into English were Die Haarteppichknüpfer, published in 2005 as The Carpet Makers, and Herr aller Dinge, published in 2014 as Lord of All Things.

Bibliography

Novels
Die Haarteppichknüpfer (1995), translated as The Carpet Makers (2005), 
Solarstation (1996), 
Jesus Video (1998), 
Kelwitts Stern (1999), 
Quest (2001), 
Eine Billion Dollar (2001), translated as One Trillion Dollars (2014), 
Exponentialdrift (2003),  (first serialized 2002 in Frankfurter Allgemeine Zeitung)
Der Letzte seiner Art (2003), 
Der Nobelpreis (2005), 
Ausgebrannt (2007), 
Ein König für Deutschland (2009), 
Herr aller Dinge (2011),  (Audiobook, 2011), translated as Lord of All Things (2014), also available as audiobook in English language
 Todesengel (2013), 
 Der Jesus-Deal (2014), 
 Teufelsgold (2016), 
 NSA - Nationales Sicherheits-Amt (2018), 

Young Adult novels
Perfect Copy: Die zweite Schöpfung (2002), 
Das Marsprojekt (2004), 
Das ferne Leuchten (2005),  (new edition of Das Marsprojekt)
Die blauen Türme (2005), 
Die gläsernen Höhlen (2006), 
Die steinernen Schatten (2007), 
Die schlafenden Hüter (2008), 
Gibt es Leben auf dem Mars oder Das Marsprojekt – der flüsternde Sturm (2009),  (a short story-length prequel to the Marsprojekt-series)
Die seltene Gabe (2004), 
Out-Series
Black*Out (2010), 
Hide*Out (2011), 
Time*Out (2012), 
 Aquamarin.
 Aquamarin (2015), 
 Submarin (2017), 
 Ultramarin (2019),

Short fiction 
Collections
Eine unberührte Welt, 2008. 

Stories

Contributions to the Perry Rhodan series
 #1935 Der Gesang der Stille (1998)
 #2295 Die Rückkehr (2005)
 #2503 Die Falle von Dhogar (2009)
 Stellaris #25 Ein unbedeutender Mann (published in Perry Rhodan #2614, 2011)
 #2700 Der Techno-Mond (2013)
 #2812 Willkommen im Tamanium! (2015)
 #2813 An Rhodans Grab (2015)

Anthologies (edited)
Eine Trillion Euro (short story anthology of European SF writers edited by Eschbach; contains stories by Pierre Bordage, Jean-Claude Dunyach, Valerio Evangelisti, Wolfgang Jeschke, Michael Marrak and others), a winner of the 2004 Grand Prix de l'Imaginaire.

Non-fiction
Das Buch von der Zukunft: Ein Reiseführer (2004),

Notes and references

Further reading
 Sonja Fritzsche: "Eco-Eschbach. Sustainability in the Science Fiction of Andreas Eschbach", in: Detectives, Dystopias, and Poplit. Studies in Modern German Fiction, ed. Bruce B. Campbell, Alison Guenther-Pal, Vibeke Rützou Petersen; Camden House, Rochester/NY 2014. S. 67–87.

External links

 
Dutch fansite with book cover images

Story Behind The Carpet Makers – online essay by Eschbach
 

1959 births
Living people
German male novelists
German science fiction writers
German speculative fiction editors
German thriller writers
The Magazine of Fantasy & Science Fiction people
People from Ulm
Science fiction editors